Ernesto Laura (23 March 1879 – 29 December 1949) was an Italian mathematician born in Porto Maurizio.

Biography
He graduated in mathematics in 1901 at the University of Turin, where he was a student of Morera and of Somigliana.

He taught rational mechanics at the Universities of Messina, Pavia and Padua.

Laura has dealt with uncommon elasticity problems, namely related to indefinitely extended elastic means and, especially in the last part of his University career, the mechanics of flexible and inextensible surfaces.

Notes

External links
An Italian short biography of Ernesto Laura in Edizione Nazionale Mathematica Italiana online.

1879 births
1949 deaths
20th-century Italian mathematicians
University of Turin alumni